José Reinaldo Carneiro Tavares (born March 19, 1939) is a Brazilian engineer and politician. He served as governor of Maranhão, from 2002 to 2007. Was minister of Transport (1986–1990) on gubernatorial of Sarney. Tavares serves as federal deputy.

References  

Democratic Social Party politicians
Brazilian Socialist Party politicians
Democrats (Brazil) politicians
Governors of Maranhão
1939 births
Living people